Cassa Pancho's Ballet Black is a British ballet company. It was founded by Cassa Pancho  in 2001 as a response to the lack of professional Black and Asian ballet dancers in the UK. The Company was established to provide dancers and students of black and Asian descent with inspiring opportunities in classical ballet.  Based in Marylebone, London, Ballet Black are a touring company with 8 dancers and an extensive repertoire of specially commissioned choreography from both established and emerging choreographers.

Ballet Black achieved charity status in 2004. Its patrons are Thandiwe Newton OBE and Kwame Kwei-Armah OBE, and Althea Efunshile is the chair of the trustees. Arts Council England made Ballet Black a National Portfolio Organisation (NPO) for 2018-2022 and awarded them £880,000. 

In addition to the professional performing company, Ballet Black also has a junior ballet school for ages 3 to 18. The classes are held in Shepherd's Bush, West London and the teachers include director Cassa Pancho and Senior Artist Cira Robinson. The junior school is a key part of the work of Ballet Black, and is essential to creating, building and sustaining the future of diversity in ballet. The company has made a list of actions resources available on their website so that other companies and dance schools can made active steps to become inclusive and anti-racist. 

Ballet Black have been nominated for several awards including The Critics' Circle National Dance Awards, Sky Arts, and Oliviers.  In the 2012 National Dance Awards (announced Jan 2013) they won the Grishko Award for the Best Independent Company, and in the 2018 awards their dancer José Alves won Outstanding Male Dancer in Classical Performance, while Cathy Marston won Best Classical Choreography, both for work on The Suit. Other nominations included the company's Arthur Pita's nomination for the Laurence Olivier Award for Outstanding Achievement in Dance in 2014 for his choreography of A Dream Within A Midsummer Night's Dream, and the same piece receiving a nomination for the 2015 Sky Arts award for dance.

Ballet Black have featured in documentaries including The South Bank Show in 2016 and  BBC Four's Danceworks. 

A collaboration with dance shoe company Freed of London was announced in 2018. Freed added two new colours, "Ballet Bronze" and "Ballet Brown" to their range of pointe shoes. This meant that dancers with skin colours other than white would no longer have to pancake their shoes with foundation to make them match their skin tones. Over a year a professional dancer gets through many pairs of shoes, sometimes a pair per performance as well as those used for daily classes and rehearsals, so the saved labour and expense for many Black and Asian dancers is incalculable.

Senior Artists Cira Robinson and Mthuthuzeli November danced as part of Stormzy's headlining act on the Pyramid stage at Glastonbury Festival 2019.

See also 
Ballet companies in the United Kingdom

References

External links

Interviews on Radio 4's Woman's Hour
  
 
 

Ballet companies in the United Kingdom
Ballet in London
2001 establishments in England
Race and society